Cathal McShane (born 2 November 1995) is an Irish Gaelic footballer and plays for Owen Roe O'Neill's and Tyrone.
McShane has an All Ireland Senior Football Championship winning medal as a member of the Tyrone GAA team in the 2021 season.

References

Gaelic footballers
Year of birth missing (living people)
Living people